This is a bibliography of books by psychologist Raymond Cattell.

1930s

1940s

1950s

1960s

 
 
 
 
 
 
 
 
 
 
Cattell, R. B., & Butcher, H. J. (1968). The prediction of achievement and creativity. Indianapolis: Bobbs-Merrill.

1970s
Cattell, R. B. (1973). Personality and mood by questionnaire. San Francisco: Jossey-Bass.
Cattell, R. B., & Child, D. (1975). Motivation and dynamic structure. London: Holt, Rinehart & Winston.
Cattell, R. B., & Kline, P. (1977). The scientific analysis of personality and motivation. New York: Academic Press.
Cattell, R. B. (1978). The scientific use of factor analysis in behavioral and life sciences. New York: Plenum.
Cattell, R. B., & Dreger, R. M. (Eds.). (1978). Handbook of modern personality theory. New York: Wiley.
Cattell, R. B. (1979). Personality and Learning Theory: Volume 1, The Structure of Personality in Its Environment. New York: Springer.

1980s
Cattell, R. B. (1980). Personality and Learning Theory: Volume 2, A Systems Theory of Maturation and Structured Learning. New York: Springer.
Cattell, R. B. (1983). Structured personality-learning theory: a wholistic multivariate research approach. New York: Praeger.
Cattell, R. B., & Johnson, R. C. (Eds.). (1986). Functional psychological testing: Principles and instruments. New York: Brunner-Mazel.
Cattell, R. B. (1987). Psychotherapy by structured learning theory. New York: Springer.
Cattell, R. B., & Nesselroade, J. R. (Eds.) (1988). Handbook of multivariate experimental psychology (2nd rev. ed.). New York: Plenum

See also
For a book and article bibliography, see this page.

Bibliographies by writer
Books about human intelligence
Psychology bibliographies
Bibliographies of American writers
Bibliographies of British writers